Crestwood Secondary School is a public high school, located in Cresco, Howard County, in northeast Iowa. Crestwood is the high school for the Howard–Winneshiek Community School District.  It serves students from the cities of Cresco, Chester, Lime Springs, Elma, and Ridgeway. Students from nearby Protivin can choose to attend this school as well. The school district was formed in 1960 by combining the independent school districts and high schools of Cresco, Chester, Elma, Lime Springs, and Ridgeway. The current high school building was built in 1969.

Academic design
The school is developing a student centered learning environment that is addressing grading systems, gaps in knowledge, and student pacing.  Students, teachers, community members, school board, post-secondary education, and administrators are developing this system.  Developing young people with the skill sets necessary for careers can be seen through this Competency Based Education system.  Traits of the CBE system are:
 Students advance upon proficiency
 Competencies include explicit, measurable, and transferable learning
 Assessment is meaningful and a positive learning experience for students
 Students receive rapid, differentiated support based on their individual learning needs
 Learning outcomes emphasize competencies that include application and creation of knowledge along with development of important skills and dispositions

Coursework
Dual Credit Coursework 
Crestwood High School offers the following to students through Northeast Iowa Community College (NICC):
 Opportunities for post-secondary credit on campus
 33 unique courses with 1588 college credits during the 2013–14 school year
 These college credits saved parents nearly $687,662 in college expenses
 On average, this is a savings of over $4,117 per student per year
 College-level curriculum including:
 Advanced Placement (AP)
 Dual Credit Classes
 CNC/Advanced Manufacturing
 Certification Programs
 Project Lead The Way (PLTW)

Athletics
Crestwood is a founding member of the Northeast Iowa Conference (as Cresco), and the Cadets participate in the following sports:
Cross country
Volleyball
Football 
Basketball 
Wrestling
 1986 class 3A state champions
Track and Field 
 Boys' 2005 class 3A state champions
Golf 
Baseball
Softball

See also
List of high schools in Iowa

References

External links
Official Crestwood High School website

Public high schools in Iowa
Schools in Howard County, Iowa
1960 establishments in Iowa
Educational institutions established in 1960